Acantharctia nigrivena is a moth of the  family Erebidae. It was described by Rothschild in 1935. It is found in Ethiopia, Kenya, Malawi and Tanzania.

References

Moths described in 1935
Spilosomina
Moths of Africa
Lepidoptera of Ethiopia
Lepidoptera of Malawi
Lepidoptera of Tanzania
Lepidoptera of Kenya